Harpoon (Kodiak Noatak) is a fictional character appearing in American comic books published by Marvel Comics. He is a member of the mutant assassin team known as Marauders, who are employed by Mister Sinister. Little is known about Harpoon other than that he is Inuit.

Publication history

Harpoon first appeared in Uncanny X-Men #210-211 (October–November 1986), and was created by Chris Claremont, John Romita, Jr. and Dan Green.

The character subsequently appears in Thor #373-374 (November–December 1986), X-Factor #10 (November 1986), Power Pack #27 (December 1986), Uncanny X-Men #213 (January 1987), 221-222 (September–October 1987), 240-241 (January–February 1989), X-Factor #38 (March 1989), Wolverine (vol. 2) #10 (August 1989), X-Man #18 (August 1996), Cable & Machine Man Annual 1999, Gambit #9 (October 1999), Weapon X #26 (September 2004), X-Men and Power Pack #4 (March 2006), New Avengers #18 (June 2006), X-Men (vol. 2) #200-201 (August–September 2007), New X-Men #44-46 (January–March 2008), X-Factor #27 (March 2008), and X-Men (vol. 2) #207 (March 2008).

Harpoon received an entry in the Official Handbook of the Marvel Universe Update '89 #3.

Fictional character biography

The Morlock Massacre
Harpoon was one of the members of the original incarnation of the Marauders, assembled by Gambit. The team ambush a Morlock girl named Tommy and a human Hellfire Club soldier called Richard in Los Angeles. They let the girl escape to the Morlocks' Alley, while they kill Richard.

In the first encounter with the X-Men during the Morlock Massacre, Harpoon hurls a harpoon at Rogue while she is vulnerable after having her powers neutralized by the Marauder Scrambler. Kitty phases Rogue hoping Harpoon's weapon will pass harmlessly through her, but the spear is in an energy state and strikes them anyway, trapping Kitty Pryde in a ghost-like state.

In other appearances during the crossover, he crosses paths with Cyclops, Beast and Iceman, and tries to kill a Morlock named Plague with Sabertooth, but they are stopped by Apocalypse, who recruits the woman to his Horsemen. He and Blockbuster later attack the X-Man Angel. Harpoon pins Angel to the wall, but before he and his Marauder cohorts can slay him, Thor intervenes and drives them off. Harpoon personally kills many, including the young mutant Cybelle.

Further appearances
Harpoon is thought to have been slain during the Inferno incident, but as often shown, Mister Sinister can clone his Marauders and bring them back at any time. Since he continues to be under Mr. Sinister's thrall, Harpoon often works as his enforcer, such as in the capture of the X-Man (Nate Grey), during the Onslaught crossover.

Harpoon is confirmed to be depowered after the M-Day incident.

After M-Day, Harpoon resurfaces with the rest of the Marauders, and still working for Mister Sinister. Whether this is one of Sinister's clones has yet to be determined. To make up for his lack of power, he carries a weaponized harpoon, which Storm takes from him and wields herself. During the final battle on Muir Island, he is telepathically dispatched by Emma Frost.

Powers and abilities
Harpoon could charge his metal spears with his own bio-energy for various effects, such as shocking or stunning his opponents.  He was also exceptionally skilled in using his spears as weapons, both in melee combat and as thrown projectiles.

Other versions

Age of Apocalypse
In the reality known as the Age of Apocalypse, Harpoon appears to be a member of Apocalypse's Infinite Patrol, the enforcers of En Sabuh Nur's purity as his swords of Justice.

As an Infinite, Harpoon is seen briefly fighting the X-Men, but he is quickly defeated by Rogue. He begs her that he wants to just surrender but unemotionally, Rogue hits him away from her; Morph shape changes into a wall to stop the soldier's pace and keep him from ending up in the Pacific Ocean.

In other media
Harpoon appears in the Wolverine and the X-Men animated television series episode "eXcessive Force", voiced by Fred Tatasciore. This version is a member of Mister Sinister's Marauders. Harpoon encounters the X-Men while they were searching for the missing Jean Grey. After determining he does not know where Grey is, the X-Men drop off Harpoon at a Mutant Response Division facility.

Footnotes

References

Characters created by Chris Claremont
Characters created by John Romita Jr.
Clone characters in comics
Comics characters introduced in 1986
Fictional blade and dart throwers
Fictional mercenaries in comics
Fictional murderers
Fictional polearm and spearfighters
Marvel Comics mutants
Marvel Comics supervillains